Mark V. Flinn is a biomedical anthropologist, specializing in childhood stress, family relationships and health.  His research includes a longitudinal 30-year study of child health in a rural community on the Caribbean island of Dominica. This study is the first of its kind to monitor stress hormones in a naturalistic setting.

Career
In 2012, Flinn was elected as a lifetime Fellow of the American Association for the Advancement of Science and the Association for Psychological Science.  Between 2013 and 2015, he was president of the Human Behavior and Evolution Society.

References

American anthropologists
Fellows of the American Association for the Advancement of Science
Fellows of the Association for Psychological Science
Human Behavior and Evolution Society
University of Missouri faculty
University of Michigan College of Literature, Science, and the Arts alumni
Northwestern University alumni
Year of birth missing (living people)

Living people